The nervous nineties is a commonly used term in cricket.

The term refers to a specific form of analysis paralysis, felt by a batsman when he has scored more than 90 runs in an innings, and is nervous because of the pressure and desire to convert this into a century (100 runs), which is a celebrated milestone of individual success in the game. This situation is referred to as batsmen being in the nervous nineties. Batsmen tend to bat in a more conservative manner when they are close to their century, in order to avoid getting out and thus missing out on the milestone. Batsmen dismissed on 99 are considered the unluckiest of the nervous nineties victims.

The opposing captain may position his fielders near the batsmen in order to create extra pressure to get the batsman out by restricting the player to defensive strokes & requiring more risky play to score runs.

These events happen despite a century being an arbitrary individual statistic that has no impact beyond the basic addition of more runs to the score.

Records and statistics 
Statistically, one of the worst victims of the nervous nineties was Australian opener (and now commentator) Michael Slater, dismissed in the nineties 9 times in his test career, and surviving to make a century 24 times. West Indian batsman Alvin Kallicharran's record was similarly poor, dismissed in the nineties 7 times for 12 career centuries. India's most renowned cricketer Sachin Tendulkar has scored in 90s 18 times in ODIs and 10 times in Test cricket and holds the record for highest number of dismissals in the 90s (a total of 28 times) across all forms of international cricket.

Sir Donald Bradman holds the record for most world centuries scored in a career without ever being dismissed in the nervous nineties: a total of 29 centuries. Greg Chappell (24 centuries) and Michael Vaughan (18 centuries) have the next best records.

While most dedicated batsmen can achieve multiple centuries and potentially dozens of opportunities to score them, for many all-rounders and bowlers, it can be rare for an innings to last long enough to achieve a century because of his team-mates losing their wickets, or for the lower-skilled bowler to be effective enough in his stroke play to come close to a century on many occasions. Shane Warne, who was considered to have a good level of skill as a power-hitting lower-order batsman, played 199 Test innings as a batsman and achieved 12 half-centuries. He was dismissed twice in the 90s, once on 90, and once on 99. Ashton Agar, playing on debut for Australia against England, came in as the last batsman and compiled the highest ever score for a number 11 batsmen, but fell for 98 with a rash pull shot from a bouncer, after nervously swatting and missing at two previous deliveries.

It is relatively rare for a player to be dismissed for 99 more than once in a Test career, although this fate did befall M. J. K. Smith, John Wright and Mike Atherton. In one particularly striking example of the nervous nineties, Atherton was run out for 99 at Lord's in 1993 after starting to run for the single which would have brought up his century, then changing his mind, slipping and failing to remake his ground.  Atherton would never make a century at Lord's in Test cricket. Eight players have been dismissed on 99 in Test cricket without ever making a century including Warne, Dipak Patel and Martyn Moxon. A statistical oddity occurred at the Karachi test between England and Pakistan in March 1973 when three players (including two in the same innings,  Majid Khan and Mushtaq Mohammed) were dismissed for 99. Geoff Boycott was the first player to be dismissed for 99 in a one-day international.

Nervous nineties are also applicable for the batsmen who get dismissed at 190s or the 290s. Steven Smith the Aussie skipper against West Indies in April 2015, Younis Khan of Pakistan, Faf du Plessis of South Africa, and KL Rahul, Mohammad Azharuddin, Shikhar Dhawan, Virender Sehwag, Cheteshwar Pujara of india were dismissed once in 190's, Rahul Dravid and Sachin Tendulkar of India were dismissed twice in the 190's, while Michael Vaughan, who would never reach 200 in any class of cricket, was dismissed twice in the 190's in the same series in 2002. England's Sir Alastair Cook was dismissed for 294 against India in 2011, India's Virender Sehwag was dismissed for 293 against Sri Lanka in 2009, and Martin Crowe, a New Zealand captain, was dismissed for 299 against Sri Lanka in 1991.

In T20 Internationals, Alex Hales is the only batsman to be dismissed for 99. Dawid Malan is the only to achieve 99 not out in this format. There have been three cases where a batsman has been dismissed on 99 in domestic T20 cricket including Marcus Stoinis in the 2017–18 Big Bash League season, Ishan Kishan and Chris Gayle, the latter both in the 2020 season of Indian Premier League. Kishan further missed out a century after getting out at 93 in South Africa Series.

References

Further reading

Batting (cricket)
Cricket terminology